The Miss Tennessee Teen USA competition is the pageant that selects the representative for the state Tennessee in the Miss Teen USA pageant.  The pageant is directed by Greenwood Productions under the ownership of Miss Tennessee USA 1989, Kimberly Payne Greenwood, since 1992.

Tennessee is in the top 5 most successful states at Miss Teen USA in terms of number and value of placements . In the 1990s, they were placed first .  They have the third (equal) highest number of semi-finalist (or better) placings and are one of only five states to have received more than three awards .

Six Tennessee teens have gone on to win the Miss Tennessee USA title and compete at Miss USA, including Lynnette Cole, who won the Miss USA title in 2000 and Rachel Smith, Miss USA 2007.  Both Cole and Smith won Miss Photogenic awards at Miss Teen USA, each five years prior to their Miss USA win. This makes Miss Tennessee Teen USA the only state and pageant to have two Miss USAs win the Miss Photogenic award at Miss Teen USA.

Blye Allen was crowned Miss Tennessee Teen USA 2023 on March 11, 2022, at Austin Peay State University in Clarksville, Tennessee. She will represent Tennessee for the title of Miss Teen USA 2023.

Results summary

Placements
Miss Teen USAs: Shelly Moore (1997), Stormi Henley (2009)
1st runners-up: Bridgett Jordan (1998), Alicia Selby (2003)
2nd runners-up: Molly Brown (1984)
3rd runners-up: Hannah Faith Greene (2015)
4th runners-up: Tiffany Stroud (2004), McKinley Farese (2022)
Top 5: Casey Porter (2000)
Top 6: Allison Alderson (1994), Lynnette Cole (1995)
Top 10: Rachel Boston (1999), Rachel Renee Smith (2002), Sofie Rovenstine (2018)
Top 12: Jaime Dudney (1993)
Top 15/16: Macy Erwin (2007), Kristen Rose (2010), Emily Suttle (2013), Morgan Moseley (2014), Savannah Chrisley (2016), Bailey Guy (2019), Ansley Ecker (2020)
Tennessee holds a record of 22 placements at Miss Teen USA.

Awards
Miss Congeniality: Missy Pierce (1988)
Miss Photogenic: Lynnette Cole (1995), Rachel Renee Smith (2002)
Best in Swimsuit: Shelly Moore (1997)

Winners 

1 Age at the time of the Miss Teen USA pageant

References

External links
 Official Website

Tennessee
Women in Tennessee